Tyson Manor is a heritage-listed house at Ruthven Street with the grounds of Downlands College in Harlaxton, Toowoomba, Toowoomba Region, Queensland, Australia. It is also known as Strathmore. It was added to the Queensland Heritage Register on 21 August 1992. The heritage listing is currently under review.

References

Attribution

External links 

Queensland Heritage Register
Buildings and structures in Toowoomba
Articles incorporating text from the Queensland Heritage Register
Toowoomba Region